Athens City Museum (Vouros-Eutaxias Foundation) is a museum in Athens, Greece. It houses a collection of a variety of Athens-related items collected by art collector Lambros Eutaxias (1905-1996). It includes antiquities, Byzantine art, sculptures, paintings, drawings, photographs and metal, glass and textile works. Also it includes furniture arranged in typical living rooms of the Athenian aristocracy of the 19th century.

This building was the first royal palace of Greece under the reign of King Otto of Greece.

References

External links
Official website
City of Athens
www.athensinfoguide.com
www.greece-museums.com

Museums in Athens
Royal residences in Greece
City museums
Art museums and galleries in Greece
Houses completed in 1831
Museums established in 1973
1973 establishments in Greece